Traveller Alien Module 3: Vargr is a 1984 tabletop role-playing game supplement, written by J. Andrew Keith, John Harshman, and Marc W. Miller for Traveller published by Game Designers' Workshop. Vargr details a race of genetically altered wolves, descended from wolves taken from Earth to another world many years ago. Part of the classic Traveller Alien Modules series.

Reception
Craig Sheeley reviewed Vargr in Space Gamer No. 73. Sheeley commented that "Vargr will get a lot of use in a Traveller campaign; a lot of players would find them interesting characters. [...] Even if you don't like the 'official' Imperium campaign, buy Vargr; it'll enliven any Traveller campaign."

Bob McWilliams reviewed Vargr, Alien Module 3 for White Dwarf #65, giving it an overall rating of 9 out of 10, and stated that "in my opinion, Vargr (the most recent release) is the best all round play aid since the Traveller Adventure."

Reviews
 Different Worlds #43 (July/Aug., 1986)
 Dragon #136 (Aug., 1988)

See also
 List of Classic Traveller Alien Modules

References

Role-playing game supplements introduced in 1984
Traveller (role-playing game) supplements